Claudio Andrés Baeza Baeza (born 23 December 1993) is a Chilean professional footballer who plays as a midfielder for Liga MX club Toluca and the Chile national team.

International career
He got his first call up to the senior Chile squad for a friendly against Paraguay in September 2015.

He made his debut on 5 September 2019 in a friendly against Argentina, as a starter.

Honours

Club
Colo-Colo
 Chilean Primera División (3): 2014–C, 2015–A, 2017-T
 Copa Chile: 2016
Supercopa de Chile (2): 2017, 2018

Notes

References

External links
 
 
 

1993 births
Living people
Chilean footballers
Chilean expatriate footballers
Chile under-20 international footballers
Chile youth international footballers
Chile international footballers
Colo-Colo footballers
Al-Ahli Saudi FC players
Club Necaxa footballers
Chilean Primera División players
Saudi Professional League players
Liga MX players
2021 Copa América players
Expatriate footballers in Saudi Arabia
Expatriate footballers in Mexico
Chilean expatriate sportspeople in Saudi Arabia
Chilean expatriate sportspeople in Mexico
Association football midfielders
People from Los Ángeles, Chile